The Norway women's national under-18 basketball team is a national women's basketball team of Norway, administered by the Norwegian Basketball Federation. It represents the country in women's international under-18 basketball competitions.

FIBA U18 Women's European Championship participations

See also
Norway women's national basketball team
Norway women's national under-16 basketball team
Norway men's national under-18 basketball team

References

External links
Archived records of Norway team participations

Basketball in Norway
Basketball
Women's national under-18 basketball teams